Manonichthys splendens, common name splendid dottyback, is a species of marine ray-finned fish in the family Pseudochromidae, the dottybacks. It occurs in the Indo-West Pacific and occasionally makes its way into the aquarium trade. It grows to a size of 13 cm in length.

References

External links
 

splendens